Tomb of Ahi Evren is a part of mosque-tomb complex in Kırşehir, Turkey.

Geography
The complex also houses the branch office of the Ministry of Culture.

History

Ahi Evren, a Muslim preacher in Anatolia (Asiatic side of Turkey) in the 13th century was leather dealer and he organized Muslim craftsmen in the cities in a kind of Medieval age professional chamber. His system worked well up to the 19th century and he is still considered as an honorary leader of the craftsmen. He was killed in 1261 the Mongols.

His tomb was built much later by a certain Hasan Bey, an Ahi craftsman in 1450. In 1481 Bozkurt of Dulkadir a bey of Dulkadir Beylik which briefly captured Kırşehir, renewed and enlarged the complex by adding a zaviye (Islamic hermintage). (Both Hasan Bey and Bozkurt of Dulkadir had inscriptions in the complex)  The exact place of his grave was predicted only by the location of other Ahi graves. The room was decorated in the 19th century.

The tomb
The tomb is composed of an iwan and two chambers. The symbolic coffin of Ahi Evren is in the north chamber. In this chamber there was another adorned coffin of a sheikh named Erzurimi. But now this coffin has been transferred to Ankara for protection. The south chamber has been restored recently. This part is designed as a showroom. In the iwan there are 5 simple coffins of nameless persons.

World Heritage Status
This site was added to the UNESCO World Heritage Tentative List on April 15, 2014 in the Cultural category.

References

History of Kırşehir Province
Tombs in Turkey
World Heritage Tentative List for Turkey